Jordan Davante Hall (born January 14, 2002) is an American professional basketball player for the Austin Spurs of the NBA G League. He played college basketball for the Saint Joseph's Hawks.

High school career
Raised in North Wildwood, New Jersey, Hall played basketball for Middle Township High School in Cape May Court House, New Jersey as a freshman before transferring to Cardinal O'Hara High School in Springfield, Pennsylvania. Entering his junior year, he moved to Saints John Neumann and Maria Goretti Catholic High School in Philadelphia, Pennsylvania. As a senior, Hall led his team to a Philadelphia Catholic League title and was named Catholic League Player of the Year. He was a First Team Class 3A All-State selection. Hall committed to playing college basketball for Saint Joseph's over offers from La Salle and Bowling Green.

College career
On February 20, 2021, Hall recorded a freshman season-high 22 points, 12 rebounds and 10 assists in a 91–82 overtime win over La Salle, the fourth triple-double in Saint Joseph's history. As a freshman, he averaged 10.6 points, 5.9 rebounds and 5.7 assists per game, earning Atlantic 10 All-Rookie Team honors. Hall led all NCAA Division I freshmen in assists. After the season, he left the program for personal reasons. Hall initially decided to transfer to Texas A&M and declare for the 2021 NBA draft while maintaining his college eligibility. However, on June 30 he announced he was withdrawing from the draft and returning to Saint Joseph's instead of transferring to Texas A&M. As a sophomore, Hall led Saint Joseph's in scoring with 14.1 points per game while also averaging 6.7 rebounds, 5.8 assists, and 1.2 steals per game. On March 18, 2022, he declared for the 2022 NBA draft, forgoing his remaining college eligibility.

Professional career

San Antonio Spurs (2022)
After going undrafted in 2022 NBA draft, on August 11, 2022, Hall signed a two-way contract with the San Antonio Spurs. He was initially waived on October 24, without having played in a game, but later on November 2, the Spurs re-signed Hall. Hall made his NBA debut on the same day, coming off the bench and scoring three points, two assists and a rebound in a 100-143 loss to Toronto Raptors. On November 29, 2022, Hall was waived by the Spurs.

Austin Spurs (2022–present)
On December 1, 2022, Hall signed with the Austin Spurs.

Career statistics

NBA

|-
| style="text-align:left;"| 
| style="text-align:left;"| San Antonio
| 9 || 0 || 9.2 || .321 || .200 || .778 || 1.3 || 1.2 || .1 || .0 || 3.1
|- class="sortbottom"
| style="text-align:center;" colspan="2"| Career
| 9 || 0 || 9.2 || .321 || .200 || .778 || 1.3 || 1.2 || .1 || .0 || 3.1

College

|-
| style="text-align:left;"| 2020–21
| style="text-align:left;"| Saint Joseph's
| 20 || 18 || 31.9 || .380 || .351 || .760 || 5.9 || 5.7 || 1.3 || .1 || 10.6
|-
| style="text-align:left;"| 2021–22
| style="text-align:left;"| Saint Joseph's
| 30 || 29 || 34.9 || .393 || .362 || .737 || 6.7 || 5.8 || 1.2 || .2 || 14.1
|- class="sortbottom"
| style="text-align:center;" colspan="2"| Career
| 50 || 47 || 33.7 || .389 || .358 || .748 || 6.3 || 5.7 || 1.2 || .1 || 12.7

References

External links
Saint Joseph's Hawks bio
USA Basketball bio

2002 births
Living people
American men's basketball players
Basketball players from New Jersey
Middle Township High School alumni
People from North Wildwood, New Jersey
People from Wildwood, New Jersey
Point guards
Saint Joseph's Hawks men's basketball players
San Antonio Spurs players
Shooting guards
Sportspeople from Cape May County, New Jersey
Undrafted National Basketball Association players